The Bangladesh International is an international badminton tournament held in Dhaka, Bangladesh and organized by the Bangladesh Badminton Federation. The tournament was established in June 2002, and was part of the Asian Satellite. In 2011, the tournament graded as BWF International Series with the total prize money equaling US$5,000, and later in 2013, upgraded to International Challenge providing total prize money of US$15,000. In 2019, the tournament dedicated to the Bangladesh "Father of the Nation" Sheikh Mujibur Rahman.

Past winners

Performances by nation

References 

Badminton tournaments in Bangladesh
2002 establishments in Bangladesh